Marvel's Wastelanders is an interconnected series of six radio drama podcasts produced by Marvel New Media and SiriusXM in association with Wave Runner Studios and launched in June 2021. The series' podcasts are set in a variation of the Old Man Logan universe, a future timeline where the world's supervillains, led by Doctor Doom, Red Skull, and Baron Zemo, teamed up to kill almost all superheroes and establish a new world order. Those heroes who survived — including Wolverine, Hawkeye, and Black Widow — are largely in hiding or broken shells of their former selves. A series of events, beginning with the return to Earth of Star-Lord and Rocket Raccoon on a mission for The Collector, leads to a final assembling of heroes for one last mission.

The series was originally announced in May 2021 as four, 10-episode podcasts featuring seperatedly on Star-Lord, Hawkeye, Black Widow, and Wolverine, along with a fifth team-up series. The first series, Marvel's Wastelanders: Old Man Star-Lord, launched in June 2021.

Originally, the series were to be style as Old Man Star-Lord, Old Man Hawkeye, Old Man Wolverine, and Grey Widow, but in September 2021, in announcing the launch of Marvel's Wastelanders: Hawkeye, the "Old Man" styling was dropped. At the same time, an additional solo title in the series, Marvel's Wastelander's: Doom, was announced. Episodes were released first to Apple Podcasts subscribers with a general release a week later. In the credits of the final episode of Wastelanders: Doom, the team-up series featuring Star-Lord, Hawkeye, Black Widow, and Wolverine, as well as Doom, was teased with the final series in the Wastelanders "audio epic" launching in December 2022.

The series of podcasts have been noted for their writing and voice acting, as well as the well-known stars associated with the project, including series leads Timothy Busfield as Star-Lord, Stephen Lang as Hawkeye, Susan Sarandon as Black Widow, Robert Patrick as Wolverine, and Dylan Baker as Doom.

Series installments
{| class="wikitable"
|+
! Title
! Seasons
! Episodes
! Original airing
! Director 
! Writer
! Sound Design
! Production Company
! Ref.
|-
|Marvel's Wastelanders: Star-Lord{{efn|Originally released as 'Marvel's Wastelanders: Old Man Star-Lord.}}
| align="center" | 1
| align="center" | 10
| align="center" rowspan="2" | 2021
| align="center" | Kimberly Senior
| align="center" | Benjamin Percy
| align="center" | Mark Henry Phillips
| align="center" rowspan="6" | Marvel New Media/SiriusXM
| align="center" | 
|-
|Marvel's Wastelanders: Hawkeye| align="center" | 1
| align="center" | 10
| align="center" | Rachel Chavkin
| align="center" | J. Holtham 
| align="center" | One Thousand Birds
| align="center" | 
|-
|Marvel's Wastelanders: Black Widow| align="center" | 1
| align="center" | 10
| align="center" rowspan="3" | 2022
| align="center" | Timothy Busfield
| align="center" | Alex Delyle
| align="center" | Daniel Brunelle
| align="center" | 
|-
|Marvel's Wastelanders: Wolverine| align="center" | 1
| align="center" | 10
| align="center" | Jenny Turner Hall
| align="center" | Jenny Turner Hall
| align="center" | Michael Odmark
| align="center" | 
|-
|Marvel's Wastelanders: Doom| align="center" | 1
| align="center" | 10
| align="center" | Jade King Carroll
| align="center" | Mark Waid and James Tae Kim
| align="center" | Mark Henry Phillips
| align="center" | 
|-
|Marvel's Wastelanders| align="center" | 1
| align="center" | 10
| align="center" | 2022–2023
| align="center" | Kimberly Senior
| align="center" | Nick Bernardone, J. Holtham and Mark Waid
| align="center" | One Thousand Birds
| align="center" | 
|}

Star-Lord
Star-Lord and Rocket Raccoon crash land in the American Midwest, a barren wasteland controlled by Doctor Doom, where they must find for The Collector an ancient cosmic relic, the Black Vortex. However, they soon encounter a number of challenges, including Kraven the Hunter, outlaw Ghost Riders, and Emma Frost. When released, the series was titled Marvel's Wastelanders: Old Man Star-Lord, but with the release of Marvel's Wastelanders: Hawkeye, it was retitled without the "Old Man" moniker.

Voice cast
The following do voice work in this podcast:

 Timothy Busfield as Peter Quill/Star-Lord
 Chris Elliott as Rocket Raccoon
 Patrick Page as Kraven the Hunter
 Vanessa Williams as Emma Frost
 Danny Glover as Red Crotter
 Nadine Malouf as Cora, Rigellian Recorder 3B02
 Dylan Baker as Doom and as Doombot
 Quincy Tyler Bernstine as The Collector
 Aasif Mandvi as Rattlesnake Pete
 Aime Donna Kelly as Francine
 Eric T. Miller as Brandon Best
 Michael Laurence as Sebastian Warn
 Elizabeth Francis as Joanna Forge
 Blake Morris as Hulk

 Episodes 

Hawkeye
30 years after Baron Zemo, the Thunderbolts, and the other villains killed the Avengers and rid the world of heroes, a blind and broken Hawkeye relives the final battle nightly as part of the Brotherhood Traveling Circus, Carnival and Ringmaster's Road Show. When his 17-year-old daughter, Ash, shows up seeking his help avenging the death of her best friend, Hawkeye's own efforts to avenge his lost friends are complicated. For Rachel Chavkin, Hawkeye is the first podcast she has directed.

Voice cast
The following do voice work in this podcast:

 Stephen Lang as Clint Barton/Hawkeye
 Sasha Lane as Ash Barton/King Zemo III
 Jess Barbagallo as Max
 Michelle Hurd as Bobbi Morse/Mockingbird
 Bobby Moreno as Fred Dukes Jr.
 Joe Morton as Ringmaster
 Tracie Thoms as Kate Bishop/Hawkeye
 Lea DeLaria as Raven/Mystique
 Shuler Hensley as Pyro
 Ron Canada as Abner Jenkins/Beetle
 Reiko Aylesworth as Destiny
 Jim Conroy as Fred Dukes Sr./Blob
 Kristin C as Karla Sofen/Moonstone
 James Saito as King Zemo

Episodes

Black Widow
Originally announced as Marvel's Wastelanders: Grey Widow. The mysterious Helen Black moves into a New York City apartment building owned and monitored by S.H.I.E.L.D..

Voice cast
The following do voice work in this podcast:

 Susan Sarandon as Natasha Romanova/Black Widow/"Helen Black"
 Eva Amurri as Yelena Belova/Black Widow/"Samantha Sugarman"
 Michael Boxleitner as Marco Marmarato
 Nate Corddry as Jordan Temple
 Amber Gray as Judy Stark/"Judy Kratz"
 Melissa Gilbert as K.I.M.
 Chasten Harmon as Lisa Cartwright
 Michael Imperioli as Stanley Petronella
 Justin Kirk as Hank Hammond
 Alan Muraoka as Dr. Brian Mizuno
 Will Janowitz as Crispin Burge
 Morgan Fairchild as Tappy Burge
 David Cale as J.A.R.V.I.S.

 Episodes 

Wolverine
Since the villains took over, Wolverine has wandered in a daze of survivor's guilt and self-loathing, but now he must help a young mutant in hiding reach safety. Jenny Turner Hall was originally hired just to direct Wolverine, but she as the project got started her role expanded to being both writer and director for the series.

Voice cast
The following do voice work in this podcast:

 Robert Patrick as Wolverine
 Ashlie Atkinson as Kitty Pryde
 Rachel Crowl as Red Skull
 Isabella Ferreira as Sofia
 Jennifer Ikeda as Rachel Summers
 Justin H. Min as Justin
 Carl Tart as Kevin
 Clarke Peters as Professor X
 Daniel Sunjata as Cyclops
 Charlie Pollock as Billy
 Cherise Booth as Jean Grey
 Jere Burns as Crossbones
 Luther Creek as Sabretooth
 Craig Bierko as Captain America
 Michael Perilstein as Bucky Barnes
 Joel de la Fuente as Ogun

Episodes

Doom
After being betrayed by the other villains on V-Day, Doom is free and has teamed up with Valeria Richards to seek revenge. The story immediately follows the end of Marvel's Wastelanders: Star-Lord.

Voice cast
The following do voice work in this podcast:

 Dylan Baker as Doom
 Danny Burstein as Hulk
 Keith David as Kingpin
 John Hawkes as Klaw
 Kristen Johnston as She-Hulk
 Elijah Jones as Johnny Claymore
 Rebecca Naomi Jones as Valeria Richards
 Hamish Linklater as Sandman
 Nadine Malouf as Cora, Rigellian Recorder 3B02
 Luke Kirby as Maximus the Mad
 Larry Yando as Mad Thinker
 Eric T. Miller as Brandon Best
 Steven Rishard as Doc Samson
 David Shih as Amadeus Cho

Episodes

Wastelanders
With the Wastelands in a state of chaos following President Red Skull's death, Hawkeye, Star-Lord, Black Widow, Wolverine, and Doom team up to stop Valeria Richards who now has the power of the Cosmic Cube.

Voice cast
The following do voice work in this podcast:
 Dylan Baker as Doom
 Timothy Busfield as Peter Quill/Star-Lord
 Stephen Lang as Clint Barton/Hawkeye
 Robert Patrick as Wolverine
 Susan Sarandon as Natasha Romanova/Black Widow
 Eva Amurri as Yelena Belova/Black Widow
 Craig Bierko as Captain America
 Cherise Boothe as Jean Grey
 Amber Gray as Judy Stark
 Daniel Jenkins as Super-Adaptoid
 Rebecca Naomi Jones as Valeria Richards
 Nadine Malouf as Cora, Rigellian Recorder 3B02
 Danny McCarthy as Iron Man
 James Vincent Meredith as Reed Richards/Mister Fantastic
 Jaden Michael as Franklin Richards
 Jeff Perry as Narrator
 Clarke Peters as Professor X
 James Saito as King Zemo
 Tracie Thoms as Kate Bishop/Hawkeye
 Larry Yando as Mad Thinker
 Thom Sesma as Lieutenant Hoffman
 Liz Sharpe as Private Jones
 Mary Hollis Inboden as Zelda
 Ramiz Monsef as Magneto
 David Cale as J.A.R.V.I.S.
 Gabe Ruiz as Human Torch
 Thom Sesma as The Thing
 Gina Daniels as Invisible Woman
 Richey Nash as Wrecker
 Ramiz Monsef as Groot
 Chris Elliott as Rocket Raccoon
 Joe Morton as Ringmaster
 Melissa Gilbert as Elevator Voice

Episodes

ProductionMarvel's Wastelanders: Star-Lord is the first scripted joint production from Marvel New Media and SiriusXM, and was described by Marvel New Media executive Stephen Wacker as "the tip of the iceberg" for the new Marvel Audio Universe. The Wastelanders podcasting project was originally planned to launch in 2020 as part of a new agreement with SiriusXM and its Pandora streaming service; however, in July 2020, SiriusXM acquired Marvel's previous scripted podcasting partner, Stitcher, in July 2020 in an effort to bolster its portfolio of podcasts. Stitcher and Marvel previously produced two seasons of the Wolverine podcast along with a Marvels podcast. Author Benjamin Percy, who scripted the Wolverine: The Long Night and Wolverine: The Lost Trail podcasts, was brought on board to script Wastelanders: Star-Lord.Beyond the Scenes
Starting with Marvel's Wastelanders: Hawkeye, additional behind-the-scenes bonus episodes featuring conversations with each podcast's actors and creative teams were released via the Apple Podcasts subscription service. Dubbed Beyond the Scenes, the episodes are hosted by Tamara Krinsky.

ReceptionMarvel's Wastelanders: Star-Lord has been praised for its casting and writing. Mike Mack at Laughing Place called Busfield and Elliott's chemistry as Quill and Rocket "hilarious," but noted that Malouf as Cora "steals the show" by providing both explanations and comedy. Taylor Bauer at Comic Years credits Percy's experience with both Marvel Comics and writing audio dramas for successfully setting up the world of Marvel's Wastelanders in the first episode without making it feel like a "detail dump."

Writing in The Guardian, Graeme Virtue lauded Marvel for attracting "top-notch acting talent and developing its superhero canon into such interesting new formats." He noted that for Wastelanders: Hawkeye and Wolverine, "Their chief aural pleasures come from the lead performances, with Avatar baddie Stephen Lang performing every hard-luck Hawkeye line as if he is auditioning for Deadwood. Terminator 2s Robert Patrick gives Hugh Jackman a run for his money as an even more grizzled Wolverine." And he described Wastelanders: Black Widow as the "standout story," noting "why Black Widow wants to infiltrate this place is the central mystery but it fires up the surveillance department, sparking a witty workplace conflict that feels more like Office Space than Avengers: Infinity War''."

References

External links
 

2021 podcast debuts
American radio dramas
American podcasts
Black Widow (Marvel Comics)
Comic book podcasts
Guardians of the Galaxy characters
Science fiction podcasts
Wolverine (comics) in other media
Works based on Marvel Comics
Scripted podcasts